Abeka-Lapaz is an urban area in the Accra Metropolitan district, a district of the Greater Accra Region of Ghana. It has a market called Abeka market.

References

Populated places in the Greater Accra Region